"Hate That..." is a song by South Korean singer Key featuring Taeyeon. It was released digitally on August 30, 2021, by SM Entertainment as the first single from Key's extended play Bad Love. The song is written by Hwang Yu-bin and composed by Stephen Puth, Lauren Mandel, and Eric Potapenko.

Background and release
On August 24, 2021, it was announced that Key would be pre-releasing a digital single titled "Hate That..." prior to the release of a new album at the end of September. On August 26, it was announced that Taeyeon would be featured on the song. On August 28, the music video teaser was released. On August 30, the song together with the music video was released.

Composition
"Hate That..." was written by Hwang Yu-bin and composed by Stephen Puth, Lauren Mandel, and Eric Potapenko. Musically, the song is described as an R&B song characterized by a "sentimental guitar melody and sophisticated rhythm" with lyrics about "expressing the hope that the other person will not forget about them after a breakup" in monologue format. "Hate That..." was composed in the key of A-flat minor, with a tempo of 77 beats per minute.

Commercial performance
"Hate That..." debuted at position 46 on South Korea's Gaon Digital Chart in the chart issue dated August 29 – September 4, 2021. The song also debuted at positions 2, 120, and 60 on the Gaon Download Chart, Gaon Streaming Chart, and Gaon BGM Chart, respectively, in the chart issue dated August 29 – September 4, 2021. The song debuted at positions 5 and 72 on Billboard World Digital Song Sales and the K-pop Hot 100, respectively, in the chart issue dated September 11, 2021.

Promotion
Prior to the song's release, on August 30, 2021, Key held a live event called "Key 'Hate That...' Countdown Live" on V Live to introduce the song and communicate with his fans.

Credits and personnel
Credits adapted from Melon.

Studio
 SM SSAM Studio – recording, digital editing
 Sound POOL Studios – recording
 SM Big Shot Studio – engineering for mix

Personnel

 Key – vocals, background vocals
 Taeyeon – vocals, background vocals
 Hwang Yu-bin – lyrics
 Stephen Puth – composition, arrangement, background vocals
 Lauren Mandel – composition, background vocals
 Eric Potapenko – arrangement
 Kim Yeon-seo – vocal directing
 Kang Eun-ji – recording, digital editing
 Jeong Ho-jin – recording
 Lee Min-gyu – engineering for mix, mixing

Charts

Accolades

Release history

References

2021 songs
2021 singles
SM Entertainment singles
Korean-language songs
Taeyeon songs
Key (entertainer) songs